Mandy Theresa O'Loughlin (born 26 July 1960), known professionally as Kit de Waal, is a British/Irish writer. Her debut novel, My Name Is Leon, was published by Penguin Books in June 2016. After securing the publishing deal with Penguin, De Waal used some of her advance to set up the Kit de Waal Creative Writing Scholarship to help improve working-class representation in the arts. The audiobook version of My Name is Leon is voiced by Sir Lenny Henry. De Waal has also published short stories, including the collection Supporting Cast (2020).

Early life 
De Waal was born in Birmingham, in the West Midlands of England, and grew up in the suburb of Moseley. She is a national of both Britain and Ireland. Her mother, Sheila O'Loughlin, was a foster carer, registered child minder and auxiliary nurse. Her father, Arthur Desmond O'Loughlin, was an African-Caribbean bus driver from Basseterre, Saint Kitts. De Waal was brought up in Birmingham among the Irish community, and has recalled: "We were the only black children at the Irish Community Centre and the only ones with a white mother at the West Indian Social Club."

Education and career 
De Waal attended Waverley Grammar School in Small Heath, Birmingham. She worked for 15 years in criminal and family law and as a magistrate (Justice of the peace). She sits on adoption panels, worked as an adviser for Social Services and has written training manuals on adoption and foster care.

She began writing for pleasure at an early age, and when her children were relatively independent, she decided to study creative writing, which she did at Oxford Brookes University, achieving a master's degree.

Her debut novel, My Name Is Leon, about a mixed-race nine-year-old boy, is set against the backdrop of the 1981 Handsworth riots and was published in 2016 by Viking (Penguin Random House) after a six-way auction between publishers. It drew on her personal and professional experience of foster care and the adoption system:

The novel has won many accolades, being chosen as the Irish Novel of the Year Award 2017, and included on the shortlists for the Costa Book Awards for a first novel and the Desmond Elliott Prize. My Name Is Leon has been produced as an audiobook voiced by Lenny Henry, who has also optioned it for a television adaptation.
She also writes short stories and flash fiction, and among her previous other awards are the Bath Short Story Award 2014, the Bridport Flash Fiction Prize 2014 and 2015 and the SI Leeds Literary Prize Reader's Choice in 2014. Her short-story collection Supporting Cast, featuring the lives of secondary characters from her novels, was published by Penguin in 2020. As well as being published in anthologies (such as Margaret Busby's 2019 New Daughters of Africa), de Waal's work has been broadcast on radio, including her story "Adrift at the Athena", which was commissioned for the anthology A Midlands Odyssey by Nine Arches Press, and "The Beautiful Thing" – "about emigration, backstory and new beginnings" – was read on BBC Radio 4 by Burt Caesar.

She has written about the need for the publishing industry to be more inclusive, and on 22 November 2017 she presented the BBC Radio 4 programme Where Are All the Working Class Writers? exploring issues of inclusivity in the arts and working-class representation in present-day British literature.

She went on to edit Common People: An Anthology of Working-Class Writers, which was crowd-funded and published through Unbound in May 2019.

In 2019, she became an "Ambassador" for the audiobook charity Listening Books. She commented: "I am a devotee of audiobooks. They reach you in a different way."

In March 2020, de Waal co-founded with Molly Flatt a three-day virtual books festival called "The Big Book Weekend", to be broadcast live across three days over the first bank holiday weekend in May as part of BBC Arts "Culture In Quarantine" programming.

The Kit de Waal Creative Writing Scholarship 
Three days after winning a publishing deal for My Name Is Leon, she began setting up a scholarship for a writer from a disadvantaged background. The Kit de Waal Creative Writing Scholarship is a fully funded scholarship, created by de Waal using some of her advance for her novel, at Birkbeck, University of London.

Launched in October 2016 at Birkbeck's Department of English and Humanities, the scholarship provides a fully funded place for one student to study on the Birkbeck Creative Writing MA, and also includes a travel bursary to allow the student to travel into London for classes and Waterstones' vouchers to allow the student to buy books on the reading list. The inaugural scholarship was awarded to former Birmingham poet laureate Stephen Morrison-Burke.

Prizes and publications

References

External links
 The Kit de Waal Creative Writing Scholarship, Birkbeck, University of London
 KitdeWaal.com. Official website
 "A Conversation with Kit de Waal", Greenacre Writers, 11 April 2016.
 Hannah Beckerman, "Kit de Waal: 'As soon as you introduce a talking horse, I'm just not interested (interview), The Guardian, 18 July 2020.

1960 births
Living people
21st-century British short story writers
21st-century English women writers
Alumni of Oxford Brookes University
Black British women writers
English justices of the peace
English short story writers
English women novelists
People from Moseley
Writers from Birmingham, West Midlands